Lara Arruabarrena was the defending champion, but lost in the first round to Ekaterina Alexandrova.

Jeļena Ostapenko won the title, defeating Beatriz Haddad Maia in the final, 6–7(5–7), 6–1, 6–4.

Seeds

Draw

Finals

Top half

Bottom half

Qualifying

Seeds

Qualifiers

Qualifying draw

First qualifier

Second qualifier

Third qualifier

Fourth qualifier

Fifth qualifier

Sixth qualifier

External links
Main draw
Qualifying draw

Korea Open
Korea Open (tennis)
2017 Korea Open